= Carbotec Industrial =

Taiwanese bicycle manufacturer

Carbotec Industrial Co. Ltd. is a Taiwanese bicycle manufacturer. The company sells its frames under its own brand and at the same time produces all frames made of carbon fiber reinforced polymers (CFRP) for some of the German brand Storck.

Carbotec has been manufacturing products from CFRP since 2004. In addition to bicycle frames and forks, the company's product range also includes CFRP rims.
